Erlend Segberg (born 12 April 1997) is a Norwegian professional footballer who plays for Aalesund, as a midfielder.

Career statistics

References

1997 births
Living people
Norwegian footballers
IK Start players
Eliteserien players
Norwegian First Division players
Association football midfielders
Aalesunds FK players